The Huntsman is a fictional character in Snow White.

Fairy tale
When the Evil Queen had learned from her Magic Mirror that Snow White will be the fairest of them all, she orders an unnamed Huntsman to take Snow White into the deepest woods to be killed. As proof that Snow White is dead, the Queen demands that he return with her lungs and liver. The Huntsman takes Snow White into the forest. But after raising his knife, he fails to kill her as she sobs heavily and begs him not to. The Huntsman leaves her behind alive convinced that the girl would be eaten by some wild animal. He instead brings the Queen the lungs and liver of a big wild boar, which is prepared by the cook and eaten by the Queen.

Modern adaptations

1916 film
In the 1916 silent movie adaption, the Huntsman is named Berthold (portrayed by Lionel Braham).

Disney
The Huntsman appears in Snow White and the Seven Dwarfs voiced by Stuart Buchanan. The Evil Queen is so jealous of Snow White's beauty that she orders the Huntsman to take Snow White far into the forest and kill her while stating that he knows the penalty should he fail. She further demands that the Huntsman return with Snow White's heart in a jewelled box as proof of the deed. When he is about to use his knife on Snow White, the Huntsman cannot bring himself to kill Snow White. After revealing the Queen wants her dead, he tearfully begs for her forgiveness. The Huntsman urges Snow White to flee into the woods and never come back to the castle. When the Evil Queen shows the Magic Mirror the heart in the jewelled box as the proof she holds of Snow White's death later that night, the Magic Mirror reveals that the heart in the box is actually that of a pig, causing the repulsed and furious Queen to take matters into her own hands by descending a winding staircase down to a dark dungeon room, taking the box with her. The Huntsman doesn't appeared again afterwards in the film. {However a short Disney movie clip made for the movie but not used shows that the Queen now turned into the Old Hag descending the staircase where the Huntsman has died of thirst and is now a skeleton; she scatters his bones}

In "The 7 Dwarfs and King Arbor's Crystal" comic that showed the Evil Queen's hag form having survived the fall, the Huntsman had gotten his revenge on the Evil Queen by setting fire to her castle just as her hag form on a stretcher and the two royal guards that were loyal to her returned to the burning castle.

In the musical adaptation, the Huntsman is seen with the Prince when they tell the King of the Evil Queen's plot to dispose of Snow White.

In 1994, the Huntsman was added when the attraction Snow White's Scary Adventures was modified. Here, the Huntsman is voiced by Peter Renaday, who also voiced the character in the 1990 Disney Read-Along of the film.

1987 film
The Huntsman appears in the 1987 Snow White film portrayed by Amnon Meskin. When the Huntsman takes Snow White away from the King to kill her on the Evil Queen's orders, Snow White figures out her stepmother's plot and escapes from him.

Grimm's Fairy Tale Classics
The Huntsman appears in the "Snow White" episode of Grimm's Fairy Tale Classics voiced by Mike Reynolds in the English dub. He is sent by the Evil Queen to eliminate Snow White. This plan fails when Snow White's friend Klaus buys Snow White enough time to get away. When the Huntsman goes after Snow White, he is attacked by a wild boar and knocked off the cliff into the forest below.

Happily Ever After: Fairy Tales for Every Child
In the Happily Ever After: Fairy Tales for Every Child rendition of Snow White that is set to a Native American theme, the character Gray Wolf (voiced by Zahn McClarnon) is in the role of the Huntsman. He is from the same tribe as his older sister Sly Fox. Gray Wolf is summoned by Sly Fox where he is instructed to take White Snow into the forest and kill her while bringing her liver as proof. When Gray Wolf does take her into the forest, he cannot bring himself to kill White Snow as it is not a warrior's way to kill a child. When White Snow learns that Sly Fox wants her dead, Gray Wolf instructs her to flee into the woods and never return. Once White Snow has fled into the woods, Gray Wolf takes the liver of a deer offscreen to pass off as White Snow's liver. Later that night, he visits Chief Brown Bear's tribe and states that he cannot stay. Before leaving, he gives Sly Fox a bag containing the liver which Sly Fox claims is the bear's liver that he promised her as Sly Fox plans to cook it up immediately.

Muppet Snow White
In the four-part comic Muppet Snow White as part of The Muppet Show comics, the Huntsman is played by Sweetums. The Evil Queen (played by Miss Piggy) orders the Huntsman to kill Snow White (played by Spamela Hamderson). But the Huntsman refuses to kill Snow White, tells her that the Queen wants her dead, and orders her to flee as far away from the kingdom as she can.

Once Upon a Time
The Huntsman appears in the first season of Once Upon a Time played by Jamie Dornan. The Huntsman is a nameless hunter who is a solitary recluse, raised by wolves. He considers the wolves to be his true family, and is greatly saddened by the deaths of animals. He is considered by the Evil Queen Regina the perfect assassin, and is hired to kill Snow White, though he spares her for selflessness. When he offers the Queen a stag's heart instead, she realizes she has been tricked and tears out the Huntsman's heart, keeping it in her vault and using it to make him her slave. When Prince Charming is led to his execution, the Huntsman helps him escape. The Prince asks him to assist him, but he states he cannot leave and not to let the sacrifice of his heart be in vain.

In Storybrooke, he is Sheriff Graham Humbert, the town's handsome and level-headed police officer. In the earlier parts of Storybrooke, Sheriff Graham helps Mayor Regina Mills in preventing Owen and Kurt Flynn from leaving town. When Emma Swan arrives, he is one of the few residents who go against Regina, making her his deputy. He and Emma are attracted to each other, though he has a secret sexual relationship with Regina, which Emma later discovers, feeling betrayed and disgusted. As he experiences flashbacks of his previous life, he seeks advice from Henry Mills, who tells him of his story. After Graham is unable to locate his heart, he ends his relationship with Regina and starts a new relationship with Emma, regaining his lost memories in the process. However, Regina crushes his heart and he dies in Emma's arms, shortly after thanking Emma for helping him remember who he truly was.

The Huntsman film series

Snow White and the Huntsman

The Huntsman is one of the two title characters in the film Snow White and the Huntsman, played by Chris Hemsworth. Eric is a huntsman whose wife, Sara, was seemingly killed while he was fighting in a war. After Snow White escapes into the Dark Forest, Queen Ravenna and her brother Finn make a bargain with Eric the Huntsman to capture Snow White, promising to bring his wife back to life in exchange. The Huntsman tracks down Snow White, but when Finn reveals that Ravenna does not actually have the power to do what she promised, the Huntsman fights him and his men while Snow White runs away. Throughout the film, Eric becomes Snow White's ally in the fight against Queen Ravenna. His allegiance slowly becomes both absolute (after finding himself smitten by the same purity in the princess that he loved in his wife) and resolute (after the revelation of the Queen's duplicity having been the cause of the death of his wife).

The Huntsman: Winter's War

The Huntsman is the title character in the film The Huntsman: Winter's War. Chris Hemsworth reprises his role as Eric the Huntsman, the film opening with a prequel scene exploring his growth as a Huntsman under the command of Freya, the sister of Ravenna. He flees her kingdom after his wife Sara is killed due to Freya's attempts to make her huntsmen reject love (it is never clarified how Sara's death as shown here can be reconciled with Finn claiming that Ravenna was responsible). Seven years later, after the events of the original film, Eric is called upon to ensure the destruction of Ravenna's mirror, but in the process he is pitted against Freya and reunited with Sara, who reveals that her 'death' was staged by Freya, who used her magic to make Eric see Sara's death while Sara saw Eric apparently leave her behind. Eric is able to convince Sara of the deception, but Freya briefly uses the mirror to resurrect Ravenna, only for Freya to assist her huntsmen in killing Ravenna when she learns that her sister was responsible for the death of her baby daughter.

Ever After High
In Ever After High, the character Hunter Huntsman (voiced by Grant George) is the son of the Huntsman.

References

Literary characters introduced in 1812
Snow White characters
Fictional hunters
Fictional characters without a name
Male characters in fairy tales